The Sacramento Metropolitan Fire District provides fire protection and emergency medical services to many unincorporated areas of Sacramento County, California as well as multiple contract cities. The fire district is responsible for the cities of Antelope, Carmichael, Citrus Heights, Elverta, Fair Oaks, Florin, North Highlands, Orangevale, Rancho Cordova, Rio Linda, Rosemont, Sacramento, Sloughhouse, Vineyard and McClellan Airfield.

USAR Task Force 7

The Sacramento Metropolitan Fire District is a member of  California USAR Task Force 7 (CA TF-7), one of the eight FEMA Urban Search and Rescue Task Forces in the state. These USAR Task Forces, which were originally designed to respond to structural collapse caused by earthquakes, have evolved to be used at disasters and catastrophes, both man-made and natural. Along with members of the SMFD, the task force also has members from the Cosumnes Fire Department, Folsom Fire Department, Roseville Fire Department, West Sacramento Fire Department, El Dorado County Fire Protection District and Sacramento Fire Department.

Some of the teams most notable deployments include the Northridge earthquake (1994), Oklahoma City bombing (1995), World Trade Center (2001) and Hurricane Katrina (2005).

Stations & apparatus

References

External links
 List of fire districts in Sacramento County

Ambulance services in the United States
Government of Sacramento County, California
Firefighting in California
Medical and health organizations based in California
Fire protection districts in the United States
2000 establishments in California
Government agencies established in 2000